Bob Kunst is an American gay rights activist and perennial candidate.

Kunst was born in 1941 in Miami Beach, Florida. He supported the 1976 Miami-Dade County Ordinance for Gay Rights and was later  involved in activism for people with AIDS. Kunst opposed Save Our Children, a Dade County, Florida voter-approved county initiative supported by singer Anita Bryant and her then-husband Bob Green. The initiative repealed the previous anti-discrimination ordinance Kunst had supported. The law was eventually repealed by the state Supreme Court of Florida in 2010.

In 1991, after allegations of financial mismanagement were published in the Miami Herald, Kunst was fired as the executive director of Cure AIDS Now.

As a Democratic Party politician, Kunst unsuccessfully campaigned in the Democratic primary against Bob Graham in the 1986 United States Senate elections in Florida. Kunst also ran unsuccessfully in the 2010 United States House of Representatives Election, this time as an unaffiliated independent, against incumbent Representative Debbie Wasserman Schultz, a Democrat, in Florida. Kunst volunteered for the Hillary Rodham Clinton 2008 U.S. presidential campaign in Florida. Kunst was president (1991-2001) of Shalom International, a Jewish group combating global Neo-Nazism and Neo-fascism movements. And he was a co-founder of the Oral Majority in 1982, the liberal and secular counter-protest group of the Religious Right organizations Moral Majority and later the Christian Coalition.

In 2018, Kunst protested outside the courthouse where Noor Salman, Omar Mateen's widow, was being tried for complicity in her husband's Pulse nightclub massacre with a sign reading "'Fry her till she has no 'Pulse'". Noor Salman was found not guilty during a trial that also exposed the fact that she was abused by her husband.

Kunst worked in marketing for the Miami Toros professional soccer team in the 1970s.

Kunst supported Donald Trump in the 2016 U.S. presidential election.

References

1941 births
Living people
Activists for African-American civil rights
American LGBT rights activists
American women's rights activists
Activists from Florida